Alex McGregor (born 12 November 1950) is a Scottish former footballer, who played for Ayr United, Hibernian, Shrewsbury Town and West Ham and 
Aldershot.

References

External links

1950 births
Living people
Footballers from Glasgow
Association football wingers
Scottish footballers
Troon F.C. players
Ayr United F.C. players
Hibernian F.C. players
Shrewsbury Town F.C. players
Aldershot F.C. players
Farnborough F.C. players
Scottish Football League players
English Football League players